Whess Harman is an artist and curator based in what is colonially known as Vancouver, British Columbia. They are perhaps most known for their beading and zine work, including their Potlach Punk series and their Together Apart Zine series.

Biography 
Whess Harman is a trans/non-binary person from the Carrier Wit'at Nation (known under Canadian government as part of the Lake Babine Nation), born in what is known as Prince Rupert, BC. In 2014, Harman obtained a Bachelor of Fine Arts from Emily Carr University of Art and Design.

Career 
Whess Harman is a multidisciplinary artist whose work ranges in media. Their practice includes beading, illustration, design, text, and curation. Since obtaining their BFA from Emily Carr University, Harman has participated in and curated a variety of exhibitions across Turtle Island and Norway, including:

 InterAccess, queersphere, (digital exhibition) Toronto ON 
 Open Space, LAND BACK, Victoria BC 
 ImagineNative, Constellations of Kin, (digital exhibition) Toronto ON 
 Crescent Beach Pop-up Gallery, Indingenous Artists Only, Surrey BC 
 Galleri Nord-Norge, native@home, Harstad NO 
 aceartinc., Oneself, and one another, Winnipeg MB 
 Gallery 101, Language of Puncture, Ottawa ON 

Much of their work uses humour or wordplay, and references their Indigenous existence and heritage, as well as their involvement  in the punk music scene. One of Harman's most comprehensive current projects is Together Apart.  The project began from a symposium event, loosely based on grunt gallery's Two-Spirit cabaret's from the early 1990s.  Together Apart now centres around a fluctuating collective of Indigiqueer and/or Two-Spirit artists. As a part of this project, the Together Apart Zine was created and now has seven published volumes. As a continuation of this work, a podcast led by Indigenous writers and creators is currently in the works.

In 2020, Harman designed a "Land Back" sewn patch, which they sold multiples of in order to raise money for organizations and legal funds that support Indigenous land defenders. The "Land Back" patch was also used in a collaboration with musical group The Halluci Nation as the cover for a song with the same title.

In January 2021, Harman was announced as the new Curator for grunt gallery, after having been involved with grunt as a curatorial assistant. Through grunt gallery, and independently as well, they have curated a variety of projects, including Spark: Fireside Artist Talks, and, most recently, Human Nature - Last Supper for the Capture Photography Festival in collaboration with InTransit BC.

Works 

 Potlach Punk Series
Together Apart Zine, Issues 1-3
Together Apart Zine, Issues 4-6
Together Apart Zine, Issue 7
 Greetings from Fort Babine

References 
  

Artists from British Columbia
Living people
Year of birth missing (living people)